The Peña de Francia is a mountain that rises to , south of the Salamanca, Autonomous Region of Castile and León, Spain, whose peak belongs to the municipality of El Cabaco.

Location
It belongs to the municipality of El Cabaco, it is one of the highest mountains of the Sierra de Francia, which in turn is part of the Central System. The synclinorium of the Peña de Francia is separated from syncline of Tamames by the granite outcrop of La Alberca. Surrounding the mountain to the north are towns that have become hotbeds of rural attractions during the last decade such as La Alberca.

Geology
Geologically it is a very complex structure and is one of the highest mountains of the western sector, namely the Sierra de Francia. It has a deformed structure with folds of various types, either highlighted by banks of Ordovician quartzites and conglomerates. These structures are located in an area near the Falla de Plasencia. The mountain is affected by dislocations to the North-East, along which there have been movements of blocks, and separating of different sectors of the folds.

Religion
Known for its Black Madonna, Our Lady of Peñafrancia, and its great Sanctuary of Our Lady of the Peña de Francia. It has a great influx of visitors during the summer months including many Christian pilgrims, but it is virtually inaccessible in the winter due to large amounts of snow. In addition the sanctuary, has a friary, a separate guest quarters for the monastery and a telecommunication antenna.

Views
From the top, the whole plain of Campo Charro is visible to the north, the Sierra de Tamames to the east, and the swamp of Gabriel and Galán to the south.

Flora
The vegetation at the bottom of the Mountain consists of  Quercus pyrenaica , pine and Scots pine, ferns, and other species like  Erica arborea  and  Erica australis , almost all of this reforestation is due to fires. In the upper layer is a remarkable presence of scrub such as  Cytisus oromediterraneus   Echinospartum  and  Pterospartum tridentatum .

See also
 Central System
 Sierra de Francia
 El Cabaco
 Sanctuary of Our Lady of the Peña de Francia
 Our Lady of Peñafrancia

References 

Sources
  'Muñoz Jiménez, J.'  and  Herráiz Sanz, C.  ':' 'The Mountains. Physics of Spain 'Guide. Alianza Editorial. Madrid, 1995.

External links 

 Web Cabaco, after which the Shrine belongs
 Web of Nava de Francia
 Web Interpretation Centre of Mining Romana del Oro. "The Cavenes El Cabaco
 Shrine of Our Lady of the Rock of France
 Paso Wolves - Rock of France
 Hiking - Walking Peña de Francia, from The Casarito (Nava de Francia, Salamanca)

Mountains of Castile and León
One-thousanders of Spain